Föllinge (Jamtlandic: Fö:Ling, from Old Norse Fylingr 'little foal') is a locality situated in Krokom Municipality, Jämtland County, Sweden with 485 inhabitants in 2010.

Notable people
 Milla Clementsdotter (1812–1892), Swedish Southern Sami woman who is remembered for guiding Lars Levi Laestadius in questions of Christian faith

References 

Populated places in Krokom Municipality
Jämtland